My BFF is a 2014 Philippine television drama comedy series broadcast by GMA Network. Directed by Roderick Lindayag, it stars Jillian Ward and Mona Louise Rey. It premiered on June 30, 2014, on the network's Telebabad line up replacing My Love from the Star. The series concluded on October 3, 2014, with a total of 69 episodes. It was replaced by Seasons of Love in its timeslot.

The series is streaming online on YouTube.

Cast and characters

Lead cast
 Jillian Ward as Chelsea Garcia / Elsie
 Mona Louise Rey as Rachel Garcia

Supporting cast
 Manilyn Reynes as Lynette "Lyn" Garcia
 Janno Gibbs as Christian Garcia
 Valerie Concepcion as Lavender "Lav" Catacutan
 Pen Medina as Gerry
 Irma Adlawan as Tonette
 Rez Cortez as Jessie
 Jaypee de Guzman as Tolits
 Leandro Baldemor as Patrick
 Via Antonio as Mindy
 Hiro Peralta as Baron
 Mariel Pamintuan as Kimberly
 Isabel Frial as Jasmine
 Miggs Cuaderno as Red
 Angel Satsumi as Giselle
 Jennylyn Chubb as Tiana

Guest cast
 Mike "Pekto" Nacua as old man
 Will Ashley de Leon as Jasper
 Bobby Andrews as Jasper's dad
 Betong Sumaya as Niccolo
 Maey Bautista as Espiritista
 Gladys Reyes as Mercedes

Ratings
According to AGB Nielsen Philippines' Mega Manila household television ratings, the pilot episode of My BFF earned a 15.9% rating. While the final episode scored a 16.2% rating. The series had its highest rating on September 19, 2014 with a 17.9% rating.

Accolades

References

External links
 
 

2014 Philippine television series debuts
2014 Philippine television series endings
Filipino-language television shows
GMA Network drama series
Television shows set in Quezon City